Yang Na (born 9 October 1982) is a Chinese surrealist artist based in Beijing

Yang was born in Chongqing, and studied at the subsidiary high school of the Sichuan Fine Arts Institute (1998–2002). She studied oil painting at the Sichuan Fine Arts Institute (2002–06) and received a Master of Arts from the same institution in 2010.

Works
2014 Lonely Mountain (oil on canvas)
2007 Peach Blossom Thief (160x150cm, oil on canvas)

Exhibition
Solo exhibitions:
2015: Lonely Mountain, Taipei
2014: Hu'nimal, Wereldmuseum Rotterdam, Netherlands
2013: Roaring Waves, Museum of Medical Humanities, Taiwan
2010: Phoenix Tree and Bodhi Tree, Museum of Contemporary Art Taipei, Taiwan

Group Exhibitions:
2014: Color Dialogue, Sharjah Art Museum, United Arab Emirates
2013: Post-humanist Desire, Museum of Contemporary Art Taipei, Taiwan
2012: Future Pass, Wereldmuseum Rotterdam, Netherlands

References

External links

www.yangna.com.cn Artist website
Wereldmuseum
FAQD

1982 births
Living people
21st-century Chinese painters
Painters from Sichuan
Chinese sculptors
People from Mianyang
Sichuan Fine Arts Institute alumni